Drilliola terranigra is an extinct species of sea snail, a marine gastropod mollusk in the family Borsoniidae.

Distribution 
This fossil species was found in the Oligocene and the Lower Miocene of Aquitaine (Southwest France)

References

External links 
 Lozouet P. (2015). Nouvelles espèces de gastéropodes (Mollusca: Gastropoda) de l'Oligocène et du Miocène inférieur d'Aquitaine (Sud-Ouest de la France). Partie 5. Cossmanniana. 17: 15–84

terranigra
Neogene France
Paleogene France
Fossils of France
Fossil taxa described in 2015